The 1970 African Cup of Nations was the seventh edition of the Africa Cup of Nations, the soccer championship of Africa (CAF). It was hosted by Sudan. Just like in 1968, the field of eight teams was split into two groups of four. Sudan won its first championship, beating Ghana in the final 1−0.

The tournament marked 4 final appearances in a row for Ghana, then tagged as "The Brazil of Africa". This record is currently unequaled.

Qualified teams 

The 8 qualified teams are:

 
  (holders)
 
 
 
 
  (host)

Squads

Venues 
The competition was played in two venues in Khartoum and Wad Madani.

Group stage

Group A

Group B

Knockout stage

Semifinals

Third place match

Final

Goalscorers 
8 goals
  Laurent Pokou

5 goals
  Hassan El-Shazly

3 goals

  Mengistu Worku
  Kwasi Owusu
  Hasabu El-Sagheer
  Ali Abo Greisha

2 goals

  Emmanuel Koum
  Gaston Paul N'Doga
  Jean-Marie Tsébo
  Diomandé Losseni
  Ibrahim Sunday
  Soriba Soumah
  Jaksa
  Muhamad El-Basheer El-Asyad

1 goal

  Jean Manga-Onguéné
  François Tahi
  Malik Jabir
  Petit Sory
  Thiam Ousmane Tolo
  Ali Gagarin
  André Kalonzo
  Léon Mungamuni
  Sayed Abdel Razek
  Taha Basry

CAF Team of the tournament 
Goalkeeper
  Abd Al Aziz Abdallah

Defenders
  Samir Salih
  John Eshun
  Amin Zaki
  Hany Moustafa

Midfielders
  Ernest Kallet Bialy
  Ibrahim Sunday
  ... Gnawri
  Camara Mamadou Maxim

Forwards
  Laurent Pokou
  Jaksa

External links 
 Details at RSSSF
 Details at www.angelfire.com
 footballmundial.tripod.com
 www.world-results.net

 
Nations
International association football competitions hosted by Sudan
Africa Cup of Nations tournaments
Africa Cup Of Nations, 1970
Africa Cup of Nations